The Pacific Coast League Top MLB Prospect Award is an annual award given to the best rookie player in Minor League Baseball's Pacific Coast League based on their regular-season performance as voted on by league managers. Broadcasters, Minor League Baseball executives, and members of the media have previously voted as well. Though the league was established in 1903, the award was not created until 1952 as the Rookie of the Year Award. It was abandoned from 1973 to 1997 before being revived in 1998. After the cancellation of the 2020 season, the league was known as the Triple-A West in 2021 before reverting to the Pacific Coast League name in 2022. The Top MLB Prospect Award began to be issued instead of the Rookie of the Year Award in 2021.

Nineteen outfielders have won the award, the most of any position. Second basemen and third basemen, each with six winners, have won the most among infielders, followed by first basemen and shortstops with five each. Five players who have won the award were pitchers.

Nine players who have won the Top MLB Prospect Award also won the Pacific Coast League Most Valuable Player Award in the same season: Willie Davis (1960), Billy Cowan (1963), Denny Doyle (1969), Robb Quinlan (2002), Adam Eaton (2012), Chris Owings (2013), Joc Pederson (2014), Joshua Fuentes (2018), Ty France (2019). Félix Hernández (2005) is the only player to win both Rookie of the Year and the league's Pitcher of the Year Award in the same season.

Four players from the Hollywood Stars and Salt Lake Bees have each been selected for the Top MLB Prospect Award, more than any other teams in the league, followed by the El Paso Chihuahuas and Reno Aces (3); the Albuquerque Isotopes, Eugene Emeralds, Denver Bears, Omaha Storm Chasers, Portland Beavers, Salt Lake City Bees, San Diego Padres, Spokane Indians, Tacoma Rainiers, and Vancouver Mounties (2); and the Arkansas Travelers, Calgary Cannons, Colorado Springs Sky Sox, Hawaii Islanders, Los Angeles Angels, Las Vegas Aviators, New Orleans Zephyrs, Oklahoma City Dodgers, Phoenix Giants, Sacramento River Cats, Seattle Rainiers, and Tucson Sidewinders (1)

Six players from the Los Angeles Angels Major League Baseball (MLB) organization have won the award, more than any other, followed by the Arizona Diamondbacks, Los Angeles Dodgers, and San Diego Padres organizations (4); the Cincinnati Reds, Philadelphia Phillies, and Pittsburgh Pirates organizations (3); the Chicago Cubs, Colorado Rockies, Kansas City Royals, Minnesota Twins, and Seattle Mariners organizations (2); and the Atlanta Braves, Baltimore Orioles, Cleveland Guardians, Houston Astros, Miami Marlins, New York Mets, Oakland Athletics, and San Francisco Giants organizations (1).

Winners

Wins by team

Active Pacific Coast League teams appear in bold.

Wins by organization

Active Pacific Coast League–Major League Baseball affiliations appear in bold.

References
Specific

General

Awards established in 1952
Minor league baseball trophies and awards
Rookie
Rookie player awards